San Juan, Puerto Rico, held an election for mayor on November 7, 2000. It was held as part of the 2000 Puerto Rican general election. It saw the election of Jorge Santini, a member of the New Progressive Party.

Incumbent mayor Sila María Calderón, a member of the Popular Democratic Party, did not seek reelection to a second term, and instead ran for governor.

Results

References

2000
San Juan, Puerto Rico mayoral
San Juan, Puerto Rico